Triteleiopsis, common name Bajalily or blue sand lily,  is a genus of one known species of flowering plant found  in Sonora, Baja California and southwestern Arizona. In the APG III classification system, it is placed in the family Asparagaceae, subfamily Brodiaeoideae (formerly the family Themidaceae).

The only known species is the bulbous plant Triteleiopsis palmeri, with the common name Palmer's Bajalily.

References

External links
Southwest Environmental Information Network Triteleiopsis palmeri  range, description, photos
Cabeza Prieta Natural History Association Sonoran Desert Plants Triteleiopsis palmeri (Blue sand lily)
Snowbirdpix, Plants of the American Sonoran Desert, Triteleiopsis palmeri  Blue Sand-lily

Asparagaceae genera
Monotypic Asparagales genera
Brodiaeoideae
Flora of Arizona
Flora of Sonora
Flora of Baja California